
Gmina Gaworzyce is a rural gmina (administrative district) in Polkowice County, Lower Silesian Voivodeship, in south-western Poland.

Neighbouring gminas
Gmina Gaworzyce is bordered by the gminas of Niegosławice, Przemków, Radwanice and Żukowice.

Villages
The gmina contains the villages of Dalków, Dzików, Gaworzyce, Gostyń, Grabik, Kłobuczyn, Korytów, Koźlice, Kurów Wielki, Mieszków, Śrem, Wierzchowice and Witanowice.

References

Gaworzyce
Polkowice County